Bebedouro is a municipality in the state of São Paulo in Brazil. The distance from São Paulo city is about 390 km.

The foundation of the city took place on May 3, 1884. The name comes from a stream used by cowboys in the 19th century for stopping and taking water. The city grew because of coffee, and, today, it is famous because of orange cultivation and orange juice factories.

The municipality contains 3 districts: Bebedouro (the main district), Botafogo (2,000 inhabitants) and Turvínea (1,000 inhabitants). There are two more villages: Andes (500 inhabitants) and Areias (less than 50 inhabitants). Andes is considered as an urban area, although it is not officially a district. There is another locality known historically because in the past it was a train station between Bebedouro and Botafogo: Mirante de São Paulo.

In Bebedouro, there are 3 hospitals, 13 health centers, several shopping stores (including a mall with more than 50 stores), 1 movie theater, 1 theater, three museums (one historical, one at the older train station, and another with old cars, airplanes and guns, known as "Museu Matarazzo"), 1 cultural center, more than 10 supermarkets (including 4 hypermarkets), two colleges, more than 30 schools, and 7 hotels (4 of good quality). 

For leisure, there are 4 large parks (Horto, Ecológico, Sinésio Junqueira Franco e Centenário). The most important park is "Parque do Centenário", located in downtown, with a large lake (whose surrounding areas is called "Região do Lago"), squares, sport courts, sport fields, space for walkers, runners, skaters and a "sambódromo" (space for carnival parades). Alongside this park, there are several bars, snack bars, restaurants, dancing clubs and small amusement parks.

There are boulevards linking the downtown to the periphery. These boulevards are interlinked by a system with circular avenues. The public transport has 6 routes with a headway of 30 minutes each. There are not free transfers between the routes. The economy of the municipality is based on orange crops and orange juice industry.

References

 
Populated places established in 1884
1884 establishments in Brazil